Los Organos District is one of six districts of the province Talara in Peru.

References